Devosia yakushimensis is a Gram-negative, obligately aerobic, motile bacteria from the genus of Devosia with a polar flagellum which was isolated from the plant Pueraria montana var. lobata in Japan.

References

External links
Type strain of Devosia yakushimensis at BacDive -  the Bacterial Diversity Metadatabase

Gram-negative bacteria
Hyphomicrobiales
Bacteria described in 2010